The Sussex County Lawn Tennis Tournament  was an early men's tennis tournament held from 1880 to 1885. It consisted of a spring tournament usually held in April and another held in autumn usually September. It was a forerunner event for the later Sussex Championships formally called the Sussex County Championships that were first staged in 1889 and are still being staged today.

History
The Sussex County Lawn Tennis Tournament was a brief pre-open era autumn tennis tournament originally played on outdoor asphalt courts at Brighton and Hove Rink, England with the exception of the 1884 event that was played on grass courts. In 1882 the organisers staged a spring event in June also played on asphalt courts, but for only two editions. There were just four editions of this event but it did feature two future Wimbledon Men's singles champions, the Renshaw twins. It was a forerunner event for the later Sussex Championships also called Sussex County Championships that were first staged in 1889.

Spring tournament

Men's singles

Autumn tournament
Incomplete list of tournaments included:

Men's singles

Women's singles

References

Grass court tennis tournaments
Hard court tennis tournaments
Defunct tennis tournaments in the United Kingdom
Tennis tournaments in England